The Hartford Chiefs was the final name of the American minor league baseball franchise representing Hartford, Connecticut, that played in the Eastern League (then Class A) between 1938 and 1952.

The Hartford team, which played at Bulkeley Stadium, was known as the Bees from 1939–43 and in 1945; it was called the Laurels in 1938 and 1944 (although Baseball America's Encyclopedia of Minor League Baseball calls the 1938 team the "Bees"); and then renamed the "Chiefs" for the final seven years of its existence, 1946–52.  It was affiliated for all 15 of its seasons with the Boston Braves, and the Bees/Chiefs nickname switch for the Hartford club is probably a result of the parent team's temporary and unsuccessful renaming as the Boston Bees from 1936–40. The 1944 Laurels were recognized as one of the 100 greatest minor league teams of all time.

Long baseball tradition
The Connecticut capital had been in organized baseball since the Hartford Dark Blues were a charter member of the National League in –77.  After those two years in Major League Baseball, Hartford was represented in eleven different minor leagues — including three earlier versions of the "Eastern League."  When the Class B Northeastern League folded after the  season during the depths of the Great Depression, Hartford was without professional baseball for three seasons. Then it joined the Class A New York–Pennsylvania League of 1923–37. The arrival of franchises in Hartford and Trenton, New Jersey, caused the NYPL to change its identity to the Eastern League for 1938, with  marking the 75th consecutive season the league has used the name.

Affiliate of Boston's NL franchise
The 1938 Laurels made the Eastern League playoffs and Hartford qualified for the postseason nine times in its 15-year history (including 1943–46 in succession), but the franchise never captured the league's playoff title. While the 1942 team included a future Baseball Hall of Fame pitcher, Warren Spahn, the Boston Bees/Braves of the era did not have an extensive player development system. Class A was prior to  a higher-level circuit, close to today's Double-A ranking, and the Hartford franchise was the Braves' most advanced minor league affiliate through 1945. In , however, the Braves began to build out their farm system, adding Triple-A and Double-A affiliates and expanding their presence in Classes B, C and D. They also worked with a second Class A farm club, the Denver Bears of the Western League, from 1949–51.

The Hartford Chiefs did not survive them; the franchise was transferred to Wilkes-Barre, Pennsylvania, as an unaffiliated team for 1953. They had two Class A affiliates that season: the Lincoln Chiefs of the Western League—inheritors of the Hartford team's nickname—and the Jacksonville Braves of the Sally League, whose star player in 1953 would be 19-year-old Henry Aaron.

Notable alumni

Baseball Hall of Fame alumni

Travis Jackson (1951) Inducted, 1982
Warren Spahn Inducted, 1973

Notable alumni
Bob Buhl 2 x MLB All-Star
 Ripper Collins (1949-1950) 3 x MLB All-Star
Gene Conley 4 x MLB All-Star
George Crowe MLB All-Star
Dick Donovan 5× MLB All-Star ;1961 AL ERA Leader
Ernie Johnson
Don Liddle
Catfish Metkovich
Bama Rowell
Sibby Sisti
Frank Torre
Whitey Wietelmann

Yearly record

2016 return to Eastern League
In 2015, after more than six decades without a team in organized baseball, Hartford officials led by then-mayor Pedro Segarra proposed building a new baseball stadium (to be known as Dunkin' Donuts Park) in the city's North End to attract the nearby New Britain Rock Cats of the modern Double-A Eastern League. The renamed Hartford Yard Goats debuted in 2016 but played the entire season on the road — with some games moved to Norwich,  to the southeast — because of construction delays.
 Despite continued problems in completing the stadium, the team began play in Hartford's new ballpark in 2017.

References

External links
Baseball Reference

Baseball teams established in 1938
1952 disestablishments in Connecticut
Boston Bees minor league affiliates
Boston Braves minor league affiliates
Defunct Eastern League (1938–present) teams
Defunct sports teams in Connecticut
Professional baseball teams in Connecticut
Sports teams in Hartford, Connecticut
1938 establishments in Connecticut
Baseball teams disestablished in 1952
Defunct baseball teams in Connecticut